Kawasaki Quad Bikes is a video game for the Wii console, developed by Data Design Interactive, a budget developer. It was released to poor reviews; IGN gave it a 2.0/10, stating that "The controls will infuriate you, the graphics will sting your eyes, you'll turn the music off, and the unforgiving gameplay will have you reaching for the Wii power button." and Games Radar gave it a 1/5 after criticizing its controls, AI, and poor camera control.

References

2007 video games
Kawasaki Heavy Industries
Racing video games
Video games developed in the United Kingdom
Wii-only games
Wii games
Data Design Interactive games